Shannon O'Hurley is an American actress who attended the Boston Conservatory of Music majoring in Musical Theatre. She has guest starred in TV shows on The Closer, Boston Legal, Desperate Housewives, The West Wing, and NYPD Blue.

References

External links 
 

Year of birth missing (living people)
Living people
American film actresses
American television actresses
Boston Conservatory at Berklee alumni
21st-century American women